Fontaines-sur-Saône is a commune in the Metropolis of Lyon in Auvergne-Rhône-Alpes region in eastern France.

The 19th-century playwright Antony Rénal died in Fontaines-sur-Saône on 2 October 1866.

Population

References 

Communes of Lyon Metropolis